STS-100 was a Space Shuttle mission to the International Space Station (ISS) flown by Space Shuttle  Endeavour. STS-100 launch on 19 April 2001, and installed the ISS Canadarm2 robotic arm.

Crew

Mission highlights 

The highest priority objectives of the flight were the installation, activation and checkout of the Canadarm2 robotic arm on the station. The arm - manufactured by MDA Space Missions under contract of the Canadian Space Agency and NASA, went into operation on 28 April 2001. It was critical to the capability to continue assembly of the International Space Station. The arm was also necessary to attach a new airlock to the station on the subsequent shuttle flight, mission STS-104. The final component of the Canadarm is the Mobile Base System (MBS), which was installed on board the station during the STS-111 flight.

Other major objectives for Endeavour'''s mission were to berth the Raffaello logistics module to the station, activate it, transfer cargo between Raffaello and the station, and reberth Raffaello in the shuttle's payload bay. Raffaello is the second of three Italian Space Agency-developed Multi-Purpose Logistics Module, manufactured out of stainless steel at the Cannes Mandelieu Space Center; that were launched to the station. The Leonardo'' module was launched and returned on the previous shuttle flight, STS-102, in March.

Remaining objectives included the transfer of other equipment to the station such as an Ultra-High Frequency communications antenna and a spare electronics component to be attached to the exterior during space walks. Finally, the transfer of supplies and water for use aboard the station, the transfer of experiments and experiment racks to the complex, and the transfer of items for return to Earth from the station to the shuttle were among the objectives.

Endeavour also boosted the station's altitude and performed a flyaround survey of the complex, including recording views of the station with an IMAX cargo bay camera.

All objectives were completed without incident, and reentry and landing happened uneventfully on 1 May 2001.

During this mission, astronaut Chris Hadfield made the first spacewalk by a Canadian.

Spacewalks

Wake-up calls 
NASA began a tradition of playing music to astronauts during the Gemini program, which was first used to wake up a flight crew during Apollo 15.
Each track is specially chosen, often by their families, and usually has a special meaning to an individual member of the crew, or is applicable to their daily activities.

See also 
 List of human spaceflights
 List of International Space Station spacewalks
 List of Space Shuttle missions
 List of spacewalks and moonwalks 1965–1999
 Outline of space science

References

Sources

External links 
 NASA mission summary 
 STS-100 Video Highlights 

STS-100
Edwards Air Force Base
Spacecraft launched in 2001